Ashling Murphy was a 23-year-old Irish primary school teacher and traditional Irish musician. On the afternoon of 12 January 2022, she was attacked and killed while jogging along the Grand Canal just outside Tullamore, County Offaly. The killing prompted fresh debate about violence against women, and vigils for Murphy were held throughout Ireland and the world. A 31-year-old Slovak man, Jozef Puška, was arrested on 18 January, and was charged with her murder the following day.

Victim
Murphy was born in Blue Ball near Tullamore and grew up with two siblings, a brother and sister. She gained a primary teaching qualification from Mary Immaculate College in Limerick, and taught in a national school in Durrow, County Offaly from March 2021. A fiddler, she had been a featured musician at the Tullamore Tradfest traditional music festival.

Attack

Murphy was jogging along the Grand Canal in Tullamore shortly after she finished work at 3 pm. She was attacked at around 4 pm on Fiona's Way, a canal walkway just outside the town in Cappincur, named after missing woman Fiona Pender. Murphy sustained serious injuries consistent with a violent assault and was confirmed to have died from strangulation. Two women, who were jogging on the opposite bank, saw Murphy being assaulted and ran to the nearest house to phone the Gardaí.
Gardaí believe that when the attacker confronted Murphy, she fought back in a desperate attempt to save her life by using her keys.

Investigation
Gardaí announced that they were only looking for one person in relation to the attack, and that they believed that the perpetrator was not known to Murphy.

The Gardaí initially detained a 40-year-old man based on the partial descriptions given by witnesses. They released him the next day after eliminating him from their enquiries. The man spoke to the Irish Independent on 15 January, recounting his experience being interrogated by Gardaí and the online threats he had received since the arrest and his subsequent release.

A Falcon Storm mountain bike was recovered from the crime scene and linked to Murphy's killing. There were reports that another woman was followed by a man on a bike in Tullamore two hours before Murphy was killed. CCTV footage of the bike on the day of the attack were recovered.

DNA evidence of the alleged perpetrator was recovered from Murphy's body, with Gardaí saying "she fought for her life". On 17 January, Gardaí said "significant progress" was being made, as they issued a renewed appeal for information and asked people to come forward if they noticed a man dressed in a black tracksuit and black runners.

On 3 March, two months after the killing, Gardaí in Dublin arrested a man and a woman in their 60s on suspicion of withholding information; they were released without charge.

Accused
On 14 January, Gardaí identified another person of interest. The suspect had presented himself to Tallaght Hospital in Dublin with unexplained injuries, which prompted healthcare workers to contact Gardaí. Gardaí carried out a background check, which led to searches of properties in County Offaly and one in Dublin. Two cars were also seized. One was a taxi, which was believed to have transported the suspect to hospital. Gardaí also carried out searches of the Grand Canal where Murphy was killed.

On 18 January, the day of Murphy's funeral, the suspect was discharged from hospital and arrested on suspicion of her murder. The next day, the suspect was charged with murder and identified as 31-year-old Jozef Puška, a Slovak national. That evening, he was brought before a special sitting of Tullamore District Court. He was heckled by a large crowd who had gathered outside the courthouse, and several of Murphy's family stood in court with framed pictures of her. Puška was remanded in custody at Cloverhill Prison to appear again at Clover Hill District Court on 26 January. Gardaí had arrested a second man earlier in the day and interviewed him in relation to withholding evidence, but he was released without charge.

On 26 January, Puška was further remanded in custody to appear again on 9 February. He was subsequently remanded in custody again until 9 March. On 9 March, the Director of Public Prosecutions formally directed Puška to face trial in the Central Criminal Court. On 25 April, the Central Criminal Court set a date of 6 June 2023 for the trial of Puška.

Reactions
People in Tullamore and across Ireland expressed shock and sadness following Murphy's death.

Taoiseach Micheál Martin declared that there was no place in Irish society for violence, particularly violence against women, which cannot and will not be tolerated. Minister for Justice, Helen McEntee described the circumstances of Murphy's death as "every woman and family's worst nightmare". Women's Aid Ireland demanded a policy of zero tolerance of violence by men against women, publishing statistics it compiled on the unlawful deaths of women in Ireland since 1996.

Towns, villages and communities across the island of Ireland and the world gathered to pay tribute to the memory of Murphy in the days after her death, with up to 100 vigils taking place in Tullamore, Dublin, Limerick, Cork, Galway, Derry, Tyrone and Armagh as well as in Melbourne, Edinburgh, London, New York, Toronto and Vancouver. President Michael D. Higgins paid tribute to Murphy's short but brilliant and generous life. Micheál Martin attended a vigil organised by the National Women's Council of Ireland outside Dáil Éireann in Dublin, where a minute's silence was held at 4:30 pm, close to the time Murphy was attacked. Campaigners led calls for an end to violence against women.

In response to the killing, Minister for Justice, Helen McEntee, said new laws to include stalking as a specific criminal offence would be published before Easter, with the laws to make it clear that stalking includes watching or following a victim, even where the victim is not aware of it, and making sure it covers all forms of modern communication. On 20 April, McEntee brought a memo to Cabinet on new legislation which would make stalking and non-fatal strangulation standalone offences, carrying a maximum prison sentence of 10 years.

On 19 January, one week after the killing, over 100 people carrying photographs and flowers attended a vigil at the site where Murphy was killed.

Funeral
Murphy's funeral took place on 18 January 2022, at St Brigid's Church, Mountbolus, in rural County Offaly. It was attended by Taoiseach Micheál Martin, President Michael D. Higgins and Minister for Justice Helen McEntee. Schools and colleges around the country observed a minute's silence at 11 am in her memory.

Mourners at the funeral mass for Murphy were told that her family and boyfriend had been robbed of their most precious gift. She was buried in Lowertown Cemetery, Mountbolus.

References

2022 in Ireland
Deaths by strangulation
History of County Offaly
Irish victims of crime
January 2022 crimes in Europe
January 2022 events in Ireland
Tullamore, County Offaly
Violence against women in Ireland
Violent deaths in the Republic of Ireland